Tarnawa Dolna  is a village in the administrative district of Gmina Zembrzyce, within Sucha County, Lesser Poland Voivodeship, in southern Poland.

The village has a population of 1,500.

The village of Tarnawa established in the 14th century and according to tradition its first inhabitants were Tatar prisoners of war. Its sister settlement, Tarnawa Górna was settled much later, in the 17th century.

References

Tarnawa Dolna